Evan M. McKie (born April 7, 1983) is a Canadian contemporary dancer, a Classical ballet dancer with Hope Muir & Karen Kain , present & past Artistic Directors of the National Ballet of Canada) describing him as one of his generations very finest dancers. Mckie is also a choreographer (which includes project management and development: concept, casting, commissioning, creating, composition, clear communication, costume/light/stage design, completion and corrections). Mckie did not choreograph  during his tenure with the National Ballet of Canada because he was told that it was "not a good idea for him."  Mckie is a dance masterclass teacher, Research Fellow at Institute for Neuroplastic Training, archivist and published writer. He spent 13 years dancing in each rank of the Stuttgart Ballet and until recently was a prominent principal dancer with the National Ballet of Canada where Mckie performed over 30 new roles & taught for the drop-in classes: InStudio, breaking attendance records along the way. He has performed as a guest dancer with numerous international companies, including the Paris Opera Ballet (2011, 2012, 2014), Bolshoi Ballet (2013), Mariinsky Ballet (2016) Tokyo Ballet (2013) & Orsolina28 in 2019/20.

Early life and education 
Evan McKie started his ballet training with Deborah DelVechio & continued at Canada's National Ballet School from the age of 8 until 14. At 15, McKie suffered a severe ligament injury and was told by doctors that he may not be able to continue pursuing ballet. McKie managed to recover without surgery & continued to train with The Kirov Academy of Ballet in Washington D.C. At 16, Mckie was invited to join Germany's John Cranko Schule by Pyotr Pestov. It was at the Stuttgart Ballet that McKie was given his first professional job as a dancer by Artistic Director Reid Anderson.

Career
After debuting at Stuttgart, McKie was eventually promoted to the ballet's principal dancer. In 2011, McKie was invited to be a guest dancer at the Paris Opera Ballet. The Financial Times stated that his performance of Onegin was "the sensation of the entire season".

McKie was invited to be a guest at the Bolshoi Ballet in 2013 and followed with performances at the Paris Opera Ballet in both January and July 2014, in different roles. In Stuttgart, under the direction and mentorship of fellow Canadian Reid Anderson, McKie danced in both classic ballets, and over 30 contemporary collaborations. 

In 2014, McKie returned to dance professionally in Canada. In a statement to The Toronto Star, the National Ballet of Canada's Artistic Director, Karen Kain, noted that "he loves the contemporary and the process of creation but also absolutely embodies the classical danseur noble."

McKie has choreographed two dance works for Stuttgart's Noverre Society and a work for Olga Smirnova of the Bolshoi Ballet in cooperation with the Youth American Grand Prix at Lincoln Center in New York. He is a visual artist specializing in backstage portraits of artists and dancers and recently held a private exhibition in Germany entitled .

McKie also researches the use of dance as part of rehabilitation from depression and drug addiction.He is also a contributor and advisory board member for Dance Magazine.

Performance repertoire 
Through his career, McKie has performed in over 100 original and adapted works for notable choreographers, including John Cranko, Kenneth MacMillan, Maurice Bejart, John Neumeier, George Balanchine , Marius Petipa, Glen Tetley, Rudolf Nureyev, William Forsythe, Jiri Kylian, Crystal Pite, Christopher Wheeldon and Wayne McGregor. His most notable roles include Eugene Onegin & Vladimir Lensky in Onegin by John Cranko, Prince Florimund (or Prince Desire) in The Sleeping Beauty , Hamlet by Kevin O'Day , Leontes in The Winter's Tale (ballet) by Christopher Wheeldon , Serge Diaghilev & Petruschka in "Nijinsky" , Iago in Othello , Des Grieux in The Lady of the Camellias, Mitch in A Streetcar Named Desire & Alexei Karenin in Anna Karenina (all 5 previously listed ballets are choreographed by John Neumeier ; Romeo, Tybalt and Paris in Romeo and Juliet by John Cranko & Alexei Ratmansky, Prince Siegfried in Swan Lakeby John Cranko , Marius Petipa , David Dawson & James Kudelka, Apollo by George Balanchine & both the Pflegmetic & Sanguinic roles in "The Four Temperaments" , also by George Balanchine.

Awards 
Top 5 International Ballet Dancers of the Year - 2020, La Notte Ballet 
The 2016 Kirov Academy Award for outstanding achievement in dance and contribution as a humanitarian.
Apuli Arte Merit Prize, Italy. Outstanding Performance in International Dance - 2012
Best Newcomer Dance Performance of the Year (nominated) - 2001, Dance Europe Magazine
Best International Dance Performance of the Year (nominated) - 2012, Dance Magazine Japan
Best International Dance Performance of the Year (nominated) - 2012, Danse Magazine
Best International Dance Performance of the Year (nominated) - 2013 & 2014 Tanz Magazine Yearbook (Germany)
Best International Dance Performance of the Year (nominated) - 2012 & 2014, Dance Europe Magazine
Best Performer, Dance Magazine (alongside Olga Smirnova) - 2014 & 2015

References

External links 

Canadian male ballet dancers
Canadian choreographers
Living people
1983 births
LGBT dancers
Canadian LGBT entertainers
National Ballet of Canada principal dancers
Canadian contemporary dancers
Dance writers